Simone Panada (born 6 June 2002) is an Italian professional footballer, who plays as a defensive midfielder for Modena, on loan from Atalanta.

Club career 

Born in Brescia, Panada started playing football at grassroots level in the nearby comune of Torbole Casaglia: in 2008, aged six, he trialed for his hometown club before joining the youth sector of Brescia's main rivals, Atalanta. He eventually came through all the youth ranks of the club until the under-19 team, with whom he won a national championship and a Super Cup and took part in the UEFA Youth League. In the meantime, the midfielder also received several call-ups to the first team, albeit without making his senior debut in any of those occasions.

On 7 July 2022, Panada joined Serie B club Modena on a season-long loan. He subsequently made his professional debut on 31 July, coming in as a substitute in the second half of a 3–1 win against Catanzaro, in the preliminary turn of the Coppa Italia. He then started the following cup match on 8 August, as his side gained a 3–2 home win against Sassuolo. Finally, on 14 August, he made his league debut, coming in as a substitute in the second half of a 0–1 loss against Frosinone.

International career 

Panada has represented Italy at all youth international levels, from the Under-15s all the way to the Under-20 national team.

In 2019, he captained the Under-17 national team both at the UEFA European Championship in the Republic of Ireland, where the Azzurrini finished as runners-up, and the FIFA World Cup in Brazil, where Italy were eliminated by the hosts and eventual champions in the quarter-finals.

On 7 June 2022, he made his debut for the Under-20 national team in a 0–1 loss against Poland.

Style of play 
Panada is a defensive midfielder, who can also play in a more advanced position, or even as a central defender. Despite having a slightly diminutive physique, he still can win the ball back and defend it from opponents, thanks to his strength and technique. A right-footed player, he is also regarded for his passing, his ability to dictate the team's tempo and his shooting.

Career statistics

Club

Honours 
Atalanta Under-19
 Campionato Primavera 1: 2019-20
 Supercoppa Primavera: 2020-21

Italy U17

 UEFA European Under-17 Championship runners-up: 2019
Individual
 UEFA European Under-17 Championship Team of the Tournament: 2019

References

External links 

 
 

2002 births
Living people
Italian footballers
Association football midfielders
Serie B players
Atalanta B.C. players
Modena F.C. 2018 players
Footballers from Lombardy
Footballers from Brescia